
Boegoe is a word of Khoikhoi origin, which may refer to a number of South African plants, fungi or a mineral, that were used in traditional preparations. Most Boegoe plants are typified by a strong aromatic odour due to volatile oils released by glands in the leaves. The name primarily denotes those plant species of which the stems, powdered leaves or volatile oils are employed in herbalism.

Members of the Rutaceae
 Agathosma species (syn. Barosma, Diosma), Rutaceae,
 including A. betulina and A. crenulata, marketed as buchu,
 A. serratifolia and Empleurum unicapsulare, Rutaceae, used as substitutes
 Thamnosma africana, Sandboegoe, Rutaceae, used in Namibia as a substitute
 Coleonema species, Rutaceae

Individual plant species
 Croton gratissimus, Koranaboegoe, Euphorbiaceae, used inland as a substitute
 Ocimum fruticulosum, Boesmansboegoe, Lamiaceae
 Osteospermum breviradiatum, Lemoenboegoe, Asteroideae
 Pteronia onobromoides, Boegoebos, Asteraceae, which has succulent aromatic leaves

Fungi
 Phellorina inquinans, Haasboegoe, a non-aromatic fungus
 Podaxon carcinomalis, Wolfboegoe, a non-aromatic fungus

Non-vegetable
 Hyraceum, known as Haasboegoe or Klipboegoe, and used medicinally by the Namaqua

Other
 Garlic chives, known as Buchu in Korean, though linguistically unrelated

Note: Various similar names are recorded, including Boechoe, Boekoe, Boggoa, Boochoo, Bookoo, Bouchou, Bugu, Buccho, Bucchuu, Bucco, Buchu, Bucku or Buka Leaves, though the names in bold print are best known.